Adrian Portas is an English musician, singer and songwriter. Portas plays several instruments including guitar, keyboards, and drums.

He has been a member of the bands Dollface, New Model Army, and Sex Gang Children. Portas wrote all of the songs for Dollface's 1995 album, Giant.

He is currently active as a guitarist in Spear of Destiny, and as the singer in the band War Machines of Love.

References

External links

 Artist Direct

Year of birth missing (living people)
English male singers
English rock guitarists
English songwriters
Living people
New Model Army (band) members
Spear of Destiny (band) members
Sex Gang Children members
Theatre of Hate members
English male guitarists
British male songwriters